Stanislav Kostka Neumann (born: Stanislav Jan Konstantin Václav Bohudar; June 5, 1875, in Prague – June 28, 1947, in Prague) was Czech writer, poet, literary critic and journalist. He has undergone many stages of creative: symbolist (I Am an Apostle of the New Life), anarchist (A Dream About a Crowd of Desperate People, and Other Verses), landscape lyric (The Book of Forests, Hills, and Waters), civilist (New Songs), communist (Red Songs) and others. He was one of the founders of the Communist Party of Czechoslovakia. He was a mentor of Jaroslav Seifert (Seifert dedicated his first book to Neumann).

References

1875 births
1947 deaths
19th-century Czech poets
20th-century Czech poets
20th-century male writers
Anarchist writers
Communist Party of Czechoslovakia members
Czech anarchists
Czech communists
Czech male poets
Writers from Prague